Edward John Drake (born 26 December 1990) is an Australian screenwriter and film director based in Los Angeles, California.

Film 
Drake worked repeatedly with Bruce Willis: He wrote and directed the films Cosmic Sin, starring Bruce Willis, Frank Grillo, and Adelaide Kane, and Apex (2021), starring Neal McDonough and Bruce Willis. He wrote and executive produced Breach, starring Willis and Thomas Jane.

Of his non-Willis-work, he wrote and directed Broil, starring Johnathan Lipnicki, Lochlyn Munro, and Timothy V. Murphy. The film was selected for Fantaspoa 2020 and several other film festivals.

Awards

Drake is the 2020 winner of the Austin Film Festival Screenwriting Award (Dramatic) for The Young Woman.

Videography

Music videos

2016
 Jack Ü – "Beats Knockin ft. Fly Boi Keno"
Autoerotique – "Count On You"

2015
 Yolanda Be Cool ft. Sixto Rodriguez- "Sugar Man"
 We Are The Ocean – "Good For You"
 The Fratellis – "Impostors (Little By Little)"
 Matrix & Futurebound – "Happy Alone ft. V. Bozeman"

2014
 Investo & Tara McDonald – "A Place To Go" 
 Klangkarussell – "All Eyes On You" 
 Kito and Reija Lee – "Starting Line"

2013
 Stanton Warriors – "Cut Me Up" 
 Kat Krazy – "Siren"
 Basto – "Dance With Me"

2012
Van She  – "Jamaica (Live)"

Filmography
2010: Where Were You (Director, Writer, Producer; Short)
2012: Rain Hail Shine (Director; Short)
2012: Animals (Director, Writer, Producer)
2020: Broil (Director, Writer)
2020: Breach (Writer, Executive Producer)
2021: Cosmic Sin (Director, Writer, Executive Producer)
2021: Apex (Director, Writer)
2022: American Siege (Director, Writer)
2022: Gasoline Alley (Director, Writer)
2022: Detective Knight: Rogue (Director, Writer)
2022: Paradise City (Writer)
2022: Detective Knight: Redemption (Director, Writer)
2023: Detective Knight: Independence (Director, Writer)

References

External links

Living people
Australian music video directors
Australian film directors
1990 births